The 2021–22 EFL League Two (referred to as the Sky Bet League Two for sponsorship reasons) was the 18th season of Football League Two under its current title and the 30th season under its current league division format.

Team changes

Stadiums

Personnel and sponsoring

Managerial changes

League table

Play-offs 

First leg
 

Second leg

Mansfield Town won 3–1 on aggregate.

Port Vale won 2-2 on aggregate, 6-5 on penalties.

Final

Results

Season statistics

Top scorers

Hat-tricks

Notes
4 Player scored 4 goals

Most assists

Monthly awards

Awards

EFL League Two Team of the season

Notes

References

 
EFL League Two seasons
1
4
Eng